Hleviše is a small dispersed settlement in the hills north of Logatec in the Inner Carniola region of Slovenia.

Gallery

References

External links

Hleviše on Geopedia

Populated places in the Municipality of Logatec